Play Square is a 1921 American silent drama film directed by William K. Howard and starring Johnnie Walker, Edna Murphy and Laura La Plante.

Cast
 Johnnie Walker as Johnny Carroll
 Edna Murphy as 	Betty Bedford
 Hayward Mack as 	Bill Homer
 Laura La Plante as May Laverne
 Jack Brammall as 	Reddy
 Wilbur Higby as Judge Kerrigan
 Nanine Wright a s	Johnny's Mother
 Harry Todd as 	Betty's Father
 Al Fremont as 	Detective McQuade

References

Bibliography
 Connelly, Robert B. The Silents: Silent Feature Films, 1910-36, Volume 40, Issue 2. December Press, 1998.
 Munden, Kenneth White. The American Film Institute Catalog of Motion Pictures Produced in the United States, Part 1. University of California Press, 1997.
 Solomon, Aubrey. The Fox Film Corporation, 1915-1935: A History and Filmography. McFarland, 2011.

External links
 

1921 films
1921 drama films
1920s English-language films
American silent feature films
Silent American drama films
American black-and-white films
Fox Film films
Films directed by William K. Howard
1920s American films